Avianca Flight 03 was a passenger flight from Cartagena, Colombia to Bogotá, Colombia that crashed on January 14, 1966. After takeoff, as the aircraft reached , it stalled and crashed into shallow water. After a 14-month investigation, engine failure was found to be a possible, but unproven, cause. Poor maintenance and inadequate inspections were also suspected.

Aircraft 

The aircraft involved was a Douglas C-54, the military version of the Douglas DC-4 produced during World War II, registered HK-730 to Avianca. The aircraft involved was produced in 1944; because of military needs, it was equipped with larger fuel tanks, which allowed for intercontinental passenger flights.

Sequence of events 
At 20:50 on January 14, the aircraft was cleared for takeoff. The plane reached  after rotation, but then began to descend. It then crashed into the sea 1,300 meters from the airport runway. Out of the 64 people aboard, only 8 survived.

External links

References 

Avianca accidents and incidents
1966 in Colombia
Aviation accidents and incidents in Colombia
Aviation accidents and incidents in 1966
January 1966 events in South America
Accidents and incidents involving the Douglas DC-4